Scoparia claranota is a species of moth in the family Crambidae. It is endemic to New Zealand.

Taxonomy
It was described by W. George Howes in 1946. However the placement of this species within the genus Scoparia is in doubt. As a result, this species has also been referred to as Scoparia (s.l.) claranota.

Description

The wingspan is about 39 mm. Adults have been recorded on wing in December.

References

External links

Image of holotype

Moths described in 1946
Moths of New Zealand
Scorparia
Endemic fauna of New Zealand
Endemic moths of New Zealand